The 1925 Texas Longhorns football team was an American football team that represented the University of Texas in the Southwest Conference (SWC) during the 1925 college football season. In its third season under head coach E. J. Stewart, the team compiled a 6–2–1 record (2–1–1 against SWC opponents) and outscored opponents by a total of 157 to 51.

Schedule

References

Texas
Texas Longhorns football seasons
Texas Longhorns football